Quaker Hill is a mountain located in the Catskill Mountains of New York northwest of North Kortright. McKee Hill is located southwest, Streeter Hill is located east, and Titus Hill is located northeast of Quaker Hill.

References

Mountains of Delaware County, New York
Mountains of New York (state)